Anaïs López (born 1981) is a Dutch photographer, and visual artist.  López is (co-)founder of Docking Station, a platform for narrative photography, which also publishes the online magazine Far Away, Up Close.

Life 

López grew up in France and came to the Netherlands when she was sixteen. She graduated from the Royal Academy of Art, The Hague in 2006, and AKV St. Joost .

Her work has been published in NRC Next, de Volkskrant and El País, among others, and has been exhibited in, among others, the Nederlands Fotomuseum, Landskrona Photo Festival (Sweden), Lianzhou Foto Festival (China), GetxoPhoto (Spain), Fotofestiwal (Poland), Photoville (New York) Art Fair Foto (Tallinn), and the Stedelijk Museum (Amsterdam).

She documents how people live in the city. She is fascinated by how people try to find (or create) a place in an urban area.

For her project "De Migrant", she was nominated for a Golden calf for best interactive and won the Zilveren Camera for best Storytelling. The work was on display until December 2020 at the Nederlands Fotomuseum in Rotterdam, and at the Swedish Landskrona Photo Festival.

Works

References

External links 

 Official website

1981 births
Living people